Brooklyn L. McLinn is an American actor and former basketball player.

Biography
Brooklyn McLinn was born in Inglewood, California, but was raised in Sherman Oaks. He grew up in a "two bedroom, one bathroom duplex" and had to share a room with three elder brothers. He started acting in school and studied hard to the point that he graduated high school by the age of 16. He decided to pursue a basketball career and played professionally overseas in Taiwan and Mexico.

McLinn decided to pursue acting instead and booked roles on television advertisements such as Gatorade, Coors and Domino's Pizza. He made appearances on major television series such as Justified, Days of Our Lives, Hawthorne, Parenthood and Rules of Engagement.

In 2019, McLinn joined the cast of Marvel's Cloak & Dagger for season 2.

Filmography

References

External links

Living people
People from Inglewood, California
Male actors from Inglewood, California
African-American male actors
Year of birth missing (living people)
20th-century American male actors
21st-century American male actors
20th-century African-American people
21st-century African-American people